Eber Simpson (August 8, 1863 – November 19, 1919) was an American politician.

Biography
Born in Ellenburg, New York, Simpson moved with his parents to Eureka, Winnebago County, Wisconsin. He worked on farms, grocery stores, lumber mills, and the Oshkosh Fire Department. Simpson served on the Oshkosh, Wisconsin Common Council from 1896 to 1904 and was Sheriff of Winnebago County. Simpson was a Republican. In 1919, Simpson served in the Wisconsin State Assembly and then died suddenly while still in office.

Notes

1863 births
1919 deaths
People from Clinton County, New York
Politicians from Oshkosh, Wisconsin
Wisconsin sheriffs
Wisconsin city council members
Republican Party members of the Wisconsin State Assembly